The Da Vinci Science Center (DSC) is a science museum and nonprofit organization in Allentown, Pennsylvania. The center has been a leader in "bringing science to life and lives to science", according to its mission statement, since its 1992 founding.

The center's slogan is Open for ExSCIting Possibilities. It excels in connecting people of all ages to the wonders of science in their lives, their creative curiosities, and tomorrow's innovative careers. Its engaging and highly-interactive experiences include a two-story exhibit floor; nearly three-dozen programs for visitors of all ages, students, educators, and community groups; and regional workforce initiatives that integrate limited-engagement exhibits with programs highlighting workforce development opportunities. The center's primary focus is introducing children to the potential of the STEM (science, technology, engineering, and mathematics) subjects.

History
The Da Vinci Science Center opened in 1992. Its earliest incarnation was as the Science Model Area Resource Team (SMART) Center at Lehigh University in Bethlehem, Pennsylvania. Its primary purpose was originally to host interactive JASON Project broadcasts for students featuring Robert Ballard, the oceanographer who discovered the wreckage of the RMS Titanic.

While the organization would host JASON Project through the spring of 1998, the SMART Center began developing additional hands-on science experiences for students in grades K-8 and their teachers with support from an anonymous benefactor. The SMART Center evolved quickly into the Discovery Center of Science and Technology and began offering public science experiences.

When the Discovery Center separated from Lehigh University in 1999, it was a small, grass-roots organization that served school field trips for grades K-8 primarily and had limited exhibit and program engagement. A 2003 merger with the former Leonardo da Vinci's Horse, Inc. (LDVHI) bolstered the organization's strength, gave it a new namesake, and added an emphasis of connecting science and technology to the arts and other disciplines.

After closing its operations in a former Bethlehem Steel building in June 2005, the center moved to a custom-built exhibit building on land its leases from Cedar Crest College in Allentown. The expanded and modernized visitor experience allowed for a deeper emphasis on public visitation, expanding its reach throughout the greater Lehigh Valley region, and developing programs for other age groups.

Emerging as the Da Vinci Science Center, the organization has adopted a focus on scientific and technical careers. Along with achieving a record number of more than 93,000 total participants, the center established its integrated workforce development initiatives as its signature experiences during the 2012 fiscal year. These initiatives integrate a limited-engagement Da Vinci Science Center exhibit experience with community programming that highlights industry workforce development needs and opportunities.

Exhibits 
The Science Center's active, hands-on exhibits make science fun, interesting, and exciting for kids. Exhibits include:

Engineers on a Roll 
A combined engineering lab, playscape, and climbing space that offers students active fun while they explore math and engineering.  Engineers On a Roll's colorful balls and long tracks that dip and curve encourage kids to predict, direct, sort, and experiment while the balls remain in constant motion

PPL Electric Utilities Energy Zone 
Ignite excitement about electrical energy in the PPL Energy Zone. Dance, spin, and get hands-on with standards-based concepts of circuits, voltage, resistance, and power generation.  Explore the Energy Dance Floor, Jacob's Ladder, Circuit Blocks, Finger Tingler, and Hand Crank Generators.

Tunnel Experience 
One of the Da Vinci Science Center's most popular exhibits, visitors learn how to hone observation skills using senses other than vision as they crawl through a 72-foot-long tunnel in complete darkness.

Physics Playground 
Students take a hands-on approach to learning about forces, motion, and simple machines.  Try a giant lever, feel the difference a pulley makes, use the superpowers of hydraulics to Lift 1000 Pounds, take a roll on a Newton Chair, and discover the forces that help planes fly.

Animation Station 
Here visitors learn the basics behind animation, including how still frame images are compiled together to create a continuous video. They get the opportunity to make their own stop-motion film by moving objects around while a computer captures photos of each scene and compiles them into a final product.

Built Like a Mack Truck 
This video-game like exhibit has visitors develop virtual green trucks that are fuel-efficient and don't produce excessive waste. During the design process, they select elements like tire tread, horsepower and fuel source, which ultimately impact how the simulation performs while maneuvering through virtual obstacles.

Deer Park Water Table 
The Deer Park Water Table is designed specifically for preschool-aged children and sits less than four feet above the ground. The exhibit features movable parts that visitors can position to change the flow of water. Visitors learn about water use, conservation, and the importance of healthy hydration.

Hurricane Simulator 
Inside this attraction, guests experience what it would be like to be inside a Category 1 hurricane as the wind races past them at speeds of up to 78 miles per hour.

Invent-a-Car 
This exhibit lets young children try their hand at designing a car from plastic parts. The kids get to add hoses to the engine, details to the tires, and, after everything looks right, they can sit inside of their creation.

KEVA Build It Up 
Here visitors build their own structures out of KEVA planks. These planks, which look like elongated Jenga blocks, allow children to test their design skills along with their problem-solving skills. The center views this attraction as one that highlights the interplay between art, math and design.

Da Vinci Pond
The Da Vinci Pond is a 560-gallon tank, lit by LED lights that gives visitors a chance to view aquatic species indigenous to the area, including a painted turtle and several fish species. This allows visitors to learn more about these animals behaviors and their importance in the local watershed environment.

Nano Exhibits 
Nanotechnology refers to studying objects that are only a few atoms wide. At the center's Nano Exhibits, visitors learn the basic behind this field and get a glimpse at how  it is used in our modern world. Visitors also get to apply what they learn themselves, building large replicas of carbon nanotubes and a feature the center calls "Balance Our Nano Future".

Newton Chairs 
Newton's popular Second Law of Motion is expressed as f = ma, or force equal mass times acceleration. That's what visitors experience here. The Newton Chairs are just chairs that roll back when visitors push each other. The simple design illustrates Newton's law – if two visitors apply the same force to each other (push each other), then the difference in their mass will create a proportional difference in their acceleration. In other words, if child does this with their parent, the child will travel back much faster because the same force input is acting against a smaller mass.

Other Locations

Da Vinci Science City
In 2016, the Da Vinci Science Center and the city of Easton, Pennsylvania signed a one-year memorandum of understanding to explore the possibility of opening up a $130 million space on the city's waterfront area. The construction for this project would have taken place on the properties along South Third Street and Larry Holmes Drive. This would have required the purchase and removal of a Day's Inn currently on the premises. Da Vinci Science City was planned to feature traveling exhibit galleries shared with the main Allentown location, and would additionally host an aquarium restaurant, large screen theater, and event center.

In 2019, DSC's CEO Lin Ericson announced that the organization would not build in Easton, and would look elsewhere.

PPL Pavilion

DSC broke ground in downtown Allentown, PA on April 22, 2022 at the building site of their new location, opening in 2024.

Leadership

Board of trustees
The Da Vinci Science Center is overseen by a board of trustees charged with ensuring the center functions consistent with the center's mission and is properly funded. The board of trustees also is responsible for electing the chief executive officer. The board consists of 30 members who meet quarterly.

The board of trustees has three committees, the executive committee, the audit finance committee, and the committee on trustees, that meet throughout the year.

Management
The current chief executive officer of Da Vinci Science Center is Lin Erickson, who is serving in this role for the second time after being rehired for the position in 2013. Prior to that, she had served from 1997 to 2005. In 2005, she moved to Ohio but returned to Pennsylvania and the Da Vinci Science Center in March 2013. During her time in Ohio, Erickson worked for both the Air Force Museum Foundation and Wittenberg University. From 2005 until 2013, the center's chief executive officer was Troy A. Thrash. In 2013, Erickson returned as chief executive officer with unanimous support from the board of trustees, which reviewed almost 175 candidates for the position. Thrash, in turn, moved to become the president and chief executive officer of Air Zoo museum in Portage, Michigan, an affiliate of the Smithsonian Institution.

References

External links

 
 

Museums in Allentown, Pennsylvania
Science museums in Pennsylvania